KCKB may refer to:

 North Central West Virginia Airport (ICAO code KCKB)
 KCKB (FM), a radio station (104.1 FM) licensed to serve Moran, Texas, United States